The 1883 Kentucky Derby was the 9th running of the Kentucky Derby. The race took place on May 23, 1883. An article in the Louisville Commercial about the 1883 Derby contained the first reference to the track as Churchill Downs.

Full results

 Winning Breeder: John Henry Miller; (KY)

Payout

The winner received a purse of $3,760.
Second place received $200.

References

1883
Kentucky Derby
May 1883 sports events
Derby